"It's Gettin' Late" is a song written by Carl Wilson, Myrna Smith Schilling and Robert White Johnson for the American rock band The Beach Boys. It was released on their 1985 album The Beach Boys and as a single with "It's O.K."

Billboard compared it to the Beach Boys' previous single "Getcha Back" which was about "teen reminiscence" saying that "It's Getting Late" brings the group's "harmonic tapestry hauntingly into the adult world."

The music video directed by Dominic Orlando, was filmed on location in Malibu, California, two months after Getcha Back.

Personnel
Graham Broad – percussion
Steve Grainger – baritone saxophone
Al Jardine – vocals
Bruce Johnston – vocals
Steve Levine – Fairlight CMI programming, drum programming
Julian Lindsay – Yamaha DX1 synthesizer, PPG Wave 2.3 synthesizer, Oberheim OB8 synthesizer
Mike Love – vocals
Kenneth McGregor – trombone
Ian Ritchie – tenor saxophone
Dave Spence – trumpet
Brian Wilson – vocals
Carl Wilson – Yamaha DX1 synthesizer, electric guitar, lead vocal

Chart positions

References

1985 songs
The Beach Boys songs
Songs written by Carl Wilson